Church Road Garston railway station was a station in Garston, Liverpool in England, it was situated on the west side of Church Road.

History 

The station opened on 1 March 1881 and closed 3 July 1939.

References

Disused railway stations in Liverpool
Former London and North Western Railway stations
Railway stations in Great Britain opened in 1881
Railway stations in Great Britain closed in 1939
1881 establishments in England
1939 disestablishments in England